Neil Robert Garratt is a British politician who has been the Conservative member of the London Assembly for Croydon and Sutton since 2021.

He was a member of Sutton London Borough Council, serving the Belmont ward.

References

Living people
Place of birth missing (living people)
Conservative Members of the London Assembly
Councillors in the London Borough of Sutton
Year of birth missing (living people)
21st-century British politicians
Conservative Party (UK) councillors